The United States Senate Committee on Claims was among the first standing committees established in the Senate.  It dealt generally with issues related to private bills and petitions.  After reforms in the 1880s that created judicial and administrative remedies for petitioners, it declined in importance, and was abolished in 1947.

The United States House of Representatives also had a Committee on Claims until 1946, when its duties were absorbed by the United States House Committee on the Judiciary.

Chairmen of the Committee on Claims, 1816–1947
Jonathan Roberts (R-PA) 1816–1818
Robert Henry Goldsborough (F-MD) 1818–1819
Jonathan Roberts (R-PA) 1819–1820
James J. Wilson (R-NJ) 1820–1821
Benjamin Ruggles (R/NR-OH) 1821–1833
Samuel Bell (W-NH) 1833–1835
Arnold Naudain (W-DE) 1835–1836
Henry Hubbard (D-NH) 1836–1841
William A. Graham (W-NC) 1841–1843
Ephraim Foster (W-TN) 1843–1845
Isaac S. Pennybacker (D-VA) 1845–1847
James Mason (D-VA) 1847–1849
Moses Norris, Jr. (D-NH) 1849–1851
Richard Brodhead (D-PA) 1851–1857
Alfred Iverson, Sr. (D-GA) 1857–1861
Daniel Clark (R-NH) 1861–1866
Timothy Howe (R-WI) 1866–1873
George Wright (R-IA) 1873–1877
Samuel J. R. McMillan (R-MN) 1877–1879
Francis Cockrell (D-MO) 1879–1881
Angus Cameron (R-WI) 1881–1885
Austin F. Pike (R-NH) 1885–1886
John C. Spooner (R-WI) 1886–1891
John H. Mitchell (R-OR) 1891–1893
Samuel Pasco (D-FL) 1893–1895
Henry M. Teller (R-CO) 1895–1899
Francis E. Warren (R-WY) 1899–1905
Charles W. Fulton (R-OR) 1905–1909
Henry E. Burnham (R-NH) 1909–1911
Coe I. Crawford (R-SD) 1911–1913
Nathan P. Bryan (D-FL) 1913–1917
Joseph T. Robinson (D-AR) 1917–1919
Selden P. Spencer (R-MO) 1919–1922
Arthur Capper (R-KS) 1922–1925
Rice W. Means (R-CO) 1925–1927
Robert B. Howell (R-NE) 1927–1933
Josiah W. Bailey (D-NC) 1933–1940
none 1940–1942
Prentiss M. Brown (D-MI) 1942–1943
Josiah W. Bailey (D-NC) 1943–1944
Allen J. Ellender (D-LA) 1944–1947

See also
List of defunct United States congressional committees

Claims
1947 disestablishments in Washington, D.C.